"Midnight Rx" is the sixth episode of the sixteenth season of the American animated television series The Simpsons. It originally aired on the Fox network in the United States on January 16, 2005, This is also the last holdover from the season 15's FABF production line but was pushed to the season 16.

The episode was written by Marc Wilmore and directed by Nancy Kruse.

Plot
Mr. Burns reserves the Springfield Air and Space Museum for a plant company party. While there, Burns acts strangely kind to all of his employees. At the end of the party, Burns announces that he will terminate the prescription drug plan. The workers chase after him, but Burns is able to escape in a wacky flying machine, based on the Pitts Sky Car. At home, the Simpsons try to figure out how they can afford new prescription drugs. Homer decides to get another job, but he can not have his choice of starring on Friends as Rachel's Irish cousin, and is unable to get a new job. Other companies follow Burns's lead and all prescription drug plans are canceled. Marge and Lisa go to the pharmaceutical company to voice their concerns but are ignored.

At the retirement home, all prescription drugs are unaffordable and the staff decide to let the old folks go cold turkey. Grampa Simpson comes up with a plan to get more drugs for Springfield. He and Homer go to Winnipeg, Manitoba, and with help from one of Grampa's Canadian friends, they are able to get unlimited access to the drugs they need. They take them back into the United States and are praised in Springfield as heroes. Later, as Grampa and Homer plan to do more smuggling trips in order to give more support for the town, which is a way to restore the drug plan. Apu and Ned ask if they can tag along with them, stating that their children are desperate to get their medicine. Homer accepts and allows them on the trip, even though Ned tries to convert Apu on the way (despite the fact he claims to be sarcastically congratulating him on his bravery of worshiping an idol). Ned even meets his Canadian counterpart, but takes an instant dislike to him when he offers Ned a "reeferino". A coffee accident fools a border guard into thinking Apu is 'expressing his faith' as a Muslim (despite being Hindu), causing the whole border patrol to hold the men at gunpoint. Homer tries to pacify the situation, but unfortunately, he accidentally slips out a large amount of pills on the pavement while opening the door, exposing their smuggling. As a result, Homer and his gang are arrested, but soon let go and banned from returning to Canada.

Meanwhile, Smithers realizes that he will die the next day after his thyroid becomes a goiter as he can no longer afford the medicine he needs that was provided under the drug plan. Burns vows to save his life, which is the only way to return the drug plan, so he takes Homer and Grampa along in his plane, the "Plywood Pelican", which he built for Nazi Germany. After getting the drugs, while flying back to Springfield, the plane loses altitude and Burns jumps off with Homer and Grampa's parachutes as they are "gifts" for his nephews. They crash-land in Springfield Town Square, almost crushing Chief Wiggum's squad car. Wiggum arrests Grampa but the people of Springfield protest, as his smuggling has gotten them the medicine they need. Seeing how much Grampa had been helping for the whole town, Wiggum lets Grampa go free. In the meantime, Smithers is revived with a kiss from Burns after receiving his medicine, and Burns, feeling very remorseful, decides to bring back the drug plan to all his full-time employees, much to their delight. In celebration to Burns' rescue of Smithers and the return of the drug plan, Homer gets a new job with Burns as a "freelance consultant" and then wonders what the lump on his neck is.

Reception

References

External links 
 

The Simpsons (season 16) episodes
2005 American television episodes
Television episodes set in Canada
Television episodes about illegal drug trade
Culture of Winnipeg